Abdol Hossein Khosrow Panah (Persian:عبدالحسین خسروپناه; born February 1967) is an Iranian Shia cleric and professor of philosophy at the Research Institute for Islamic Culture and Thought. He is also Secretary and member of Supreme Council of the Cultural Revolution since January 2023.

Education
He did his bachelor of Islamic studies (Islamic Jurisprudence and Principals) at Qom Islamic Seminary, Iran, 1986 and his master of Islamic studies (Islamic Jurisprudence and Principals) at that place in 1989.

Career
He is the former head of "Institute For Research In Philosophy" (IRIP) (Persian: مؤسسه پژوهشی حکمت و فلسفه ایران). He authored more than 30 books and 150 scholarly articles. He has held several lectures in different countries such as Saudi Arabia, UK, Iraq, UAE, China, India, Russia, Georgia, Malaysia, Lebanon, Syria and Turkey.

Works
 Dictionary of Philosophy
 New Kalam
 Religious and Political Pluralism
 Scope of Religion
 Morality in Koran
 Pathology of Religious Society
 Intellectuals and Intellectualism 
 The Philosophy of Islamic Philosophy
 Ontology of Knowledge

References

21st-century Iranian philosophers
Shia Islam
1967 births
Living people
Academic staff of the Research Institute for Islamic Culture and Thought
20th-century Iranian philosophers